MV Empire MacDermott was a bulk grain ship built as a Merchant Aircraft Carrier (MAC ship). She served with the British Merchant Navy during the Second World War, with rudimentary aircraft handling facilities operated by a Fleet Air Arm "air party".

Empire MacDermott was built by William Denny and Brothers, Dumbarton, Scotland. She spent most of her time on the Atlantic convoy routes, providing air cover and transporting desperately needed grain to the UK. After the end of the, she was handed over to Buries Markes Ltd, London in 1947 and returned to merchant service the following year under the name La Cumbre.  She was sold on again in 1959, this time to Canero Cia Nav. S. A., Panama.  They sailed her as Parnon under the Greek flag until 1969, when they sold her to Southern Shipping & Enterprises, Hong Kong.  They renamed her Starlight, and sailed her under the Somalian flag.  She was then transferred to the China Ocean Shipping Co, Peking in 1975, and by 1991 she had been deleted from Lloyd's Register.

External links
 Empire MacDermott at fleetairarmarchive.net
 Empire MacDermott at Uboat.net
 List and history of the Empire ships

Bulk carriers
Grain ships
Empire MacDermott
1944 ships